Wainui is a locality in the Rodney Ward of the Auckland Region of New Zealand. Wainui is approximately 5.5 kilometres north-east of Waitoki and 10 km west of Orewa. The Wainui Stream flows south-west through the area, and exits into the Kaukapakapa River.

History

Wainui is an old established area which saw people with English, Scottish and Irish roots settle around 1850.
Among the first settlers were two farmers, Hutson and Thick followed by King, Lloyd and Jacobs. About
1860 the Lambert, Lamont, Fennell and Scott families started to clear further land for cultivation. When these settlers arrived Wainui
consisted of teatree and fern with fairly extensive areas in virgin bush including magnificent kauris. The two
main means of livelihood open to the settlers at that time were timber and gumdigging.

Demographics

Wainui-Waiwera had a population of 1,674 at the 2018 New Zealand census, an increase of 261 people (18.5%) since the 2013 census, and an increase of 348 people (26.2%) since the 2006 census. There were 612 households, comprising 834 males and 840 females, giving a sex ratio of 0.99 males per female. The median age was 45.6 years (compared with 37.4 years nationally), with 291 people (17.4%) aged under 15 years, 276 (16.5%) aged 15 to 29, 819 (48.9%) aged 30 to 64, and 288 (17.2%) aged 65 or older.

Ethnicities were 93.0% European/Pākehā, 9.0% Māori, 2.0% Pacific peoples, 3.8% Asian, and 1.4% other ethnicities. People may identify with more than one ethnicity.

The percentage of people born overseas was 25.6, compared with 27.1% nationally.

Although some people chose not to answer the census's question about religious affiliation, 53.2% had no religion, 35.7% were Christian, 0.4% had Māori religious beliefs, 0.7% were Hindu, 0.7% were Muslim, 0.2% were Buddhist and 2.0% had other religions.

Of those at least 15 years old, 294 (21.3%) people had a bachelor's or higher degree, and 162 (11.7%) people had no formal qualifications. The median income was $37,400, compared with $31,800 nationally. 324 people (23.4%) earned over $70,000 compared to 17.2% nationally. The employment status of those at least 15 was that 711 (51.4%) people were employed full-time, 285 (20.6%) were part-time, and 39 (2.8%) were unemployed.

Education
Wainui School is a coeducational full primary (years 1–8) school with a roll of  students as of  The school opened in 1879 and celebrated its 125th anniversary in 2004.

As early as the 1860s formal schooling was conducted, not in a schoolroom, but in the teacher's own home.
In 1870 the local Presbyterian church was built which is depicted on the Wainui School logo. By 1878 the
need for a school was obvious so the schoolhouse was built, then the first classroom opened its door at the
beginning of 1879 but the head teacher had to be shared with another school (Locknorrie) so schooling only
lasted until lunchtime. It wasn't until 1912 that Wainui became a full-time school with a roll of 20 pupils. At
this time there was no transport to the nearest high school so pupils stayed on until they were 15 years of age.
By 1946 another classroom was required as the roll had risen to 60 pupils and with more farms being
developed in the area this was to be a continuing theme.

In 1969, the original old school room had become redundant as new classrooms were built. This building
was removed from the school grounds. The original school room is now part of the Museum of Transport and Technology in Auckland.

Over the proceeding years the roll has continued to grow and with more farms being sub-divided this will be
a continuing trend. By the beginning of the new millennium the school had reached 200. While traditionally
a farming area, the make-up of the area has changed somewhat. Most of the contributing families are now
small holding “life-style block” owners, working in the local area, the North Shore or Auckland city.

Notes

External links
 Wainui School
 Wainui Settlers' Church

Rodney Local Board Area
Populated places in the Auckland Region